John Newcomer (December 18, 1797 – April 21, 1861) was an American politician and farmer from Maryland. He served as a member of the Maryland Senate, representing Washington County, from 1840 to 1846.

Early life
John Newcomer was born on December 18, 1797, to Henry Newcomer.

Career
Newcomer was a large real estate holder in Washington County, Maryland. He worked his farm and operated a mill in Beaver Creek. He founded Newcomer & Stonebraker, a flour and grain commission firm in Baltimore.

Newcomer served as sheriff of Washington County from 1836 to 1839. He served as a member of the Maryland Senate, representing Washington County, from 1840 to 1846. He served as county commissioner of Washington County in 1846 and 1859. He was a delegate to the convention that framed the Maryland Constitution of 1850.

Personal life
Newcomer married his cousin Catherine Newcomer, daughter of Samuel Newcomer. Their son was Benjamin Franklin Newcomer.

Newcomer died on April 21, 1861.

References

1797 births
1871 deaths
People from Washington County, Maryland
Maryland state senators
Maryland sheriffs